The Strange Ones is a 2017 American thriller drama film directed by Christopher Radcliff and Lauren Wolkstein, and written by Christopher Radcliff. It is a feature-length adaptation of a short film directed by Radcliff and Wolkstein in 2011. The film stars Alex Pettyfer, James Freedson-Jackson, Emily Althaus, Gene Jones, Owen Campbell, and Tobias Campbell. It was released on DirecTV on December 7, 2017, before arriving on video on demand and in theaters on January 5, 2018, released by Vertical Entertainment.

Plot
The film opens as a house fire sends a teenage boy, Sam, and a twenty-something man, Nick, on a road trip across rural America. As they head towards what Nick believes could be a second chance, they tell people at diners and rest stops that they're brothers Nick and Jeremiah and on vacation. Seeming jealousy on Sam's part over anyone spending time with Nick soon suggests that a darker relationship exists between the two males. Sam has difficulty interpreting the difference between reality and dreams. Nick tells him that it doesn't matter and that Sam can turn his dreams into reality.

Cast 
 Alex Pettyfer as Nick
 James Freedson-Jackson as Sam
 Emily Althaus as Kelly
 Gene Jones as Gary
 Owen Campbell as Luke
 Tobias Campbell as Jeremiah
 Marin Ireland as Crystal
 Will Blomker as Robert
 Birgit Huppuch as Dr. Faller
 Olivia Wang as Sarah

Production 
The Strange Ones is based on a 2011 short film of the same name co-directed by Wolkstein and Radcliffe. The short centers on a man and young boy who arouse suspicion from others at a roadside motel. It features David Call, Tobias Campbell (who appears in the full-length film), and Merritt Wever.

Release
The film premiered at South by Southwest on March 11, 2017. On May 20, 2017, Vertical Entertainment and DirecTV acquired distribution rights to the film. The film was released on DirecTV on December 7, 2017, before its release on video on demand and in theaters on January 5, 2018, by Vertical Entertainment.

Reception
On review aggregator website Rotten Tomatoes, the film holds an approval rating of 55% based on 29 reviews, with an average rating of 5.70/10. On Metacritic, the film has a weighted average score of 57 out of 100, based on 10 critics, indicating "mixed or average reviews".

David Edelstein of New York wrote the film "is a perfect demonstration of how the craft of storytelling is also the craft of withholding - of revealing as little as possible in carefully parceled-out amounts." Matt Zoller Seitz of RogerEbert.com described it as "One of those take-it-or-leave it movies where you either surrender completely to the mood and style of the filmmaking or start questioning what it's leaving out, covering up, or glossing over."

References

External links
 
 

2017 films
2017 drama films
American drama films
American thriller drama films
2017 thriller drama films
2010s road movies
Films about kidnapping in the United States
Features based on short films
2017 independent films
2010s English-language films
2010s American films